Casta Álvarez Barceló (1786 – 29 April 1846) was an Aragonese insurgent, who fought in the First siege of Zaragoza. This took place during the 1808 to 1814 Spanish War of Independence, or Guerra de la Independencia Española, part of the Peninsular War. She is known for inspiring the defenders of the city by single-handedly defeating an advancing French cavalry troop. Her story was popularised in a series of engravings entitled  (Ruins of Zaragoza) published in 1812 and 1813. For her actions, she received a pension from Ferdinand VII of Spain and, at the centenary of the siege, her body was reinterred with honour.

Biography

Álvarez Barceló was born of humble origins in 1786, the daughter of Manuela Barlo and Manuela Barlo, both natives of Figueruelas. She may have been a native of Zaragoza, or born in Orán in Algeria and moved to the city later in life. However, by 1808 she was a resident of the city. Following the Dos de Mayo Uprising in Madrid, French and Polish forces under Charles Lefebvre-Desnouettes were sent by Napoleon to put down the insurrection. On 15 June 1808, Lefebvre-Desnouettes arrived at Zaragoza ready to attack the city.

The attack on the city was particularly brutal, being a combination of hand to hand combat on the streets and a siege to starve the citizens, which led to a huge human toll from disease as well as the conflict itself. The defenders, led by José de Palafox y Melci, were ill-trained compared to the French and Polish troops and fought a desperate fight. Álvarez Barceló helped organise supplies and munitions for the citizens and defenders.

In addition to this crucial work, while operating near the Puerta del Carmen, she found herself in grave danger. Suddenly surrounded by French cavalry, rather than fleeing, she picked up a discarded musket and started firing. The French, surprised by the fierceness of this Spanish peasant and her skill with the weapon, retreated. Her actions inspired the defending troops and the French forces were repulsed. She subsequently also participated in the second siege of Zaragoza and once again her personality, as well as her military prowess, inspired the people of Zaragoza, who considered her a hero.

Once the city was occupied by the French forces, she moved with her parents to Cabañas de Ebro. After the conflict, she married a wealthy farmer in 1814 and lived the rest of her life in obscurity, dying a widow at the age of 60 on 29 April 1846.

Legacy
Despite the fact that the Spanish were ultimately defeated at Zaragoza, Álvarez Barceló, along with other heroines of the conflict like Agustina de Aragón, became an important national icon. The inspiration from these female fighters is visible in Francisco Goya's work The Disasters of War. Her story was told in the reports of the day which spread across the continent of Europe, particularly inspiring contemporary British readers. Her image was popularised in the series of engravings by Juan Gálvez and Fernando Brambila entitled  (Ruins of Zaragoza) published in Cádiz in 1812 and 1813. A portrait by Marcelino de Unceta from 1875 was also displayed in Zaragoza.  In 1908, at the centennial of the siege, her body was re-interred in honour in the Chapel of the Anunciación del Santuario de Nuestra Señora del Portillo and a road was named after her.

See also

Giuseppa Bolognara Calcagno
Juana Galán
María Mayor Fernández de Cámara y Pita

Notes

References

Sources

 
 
 
 
 
 
 
 

1776 births
1846 deaths
Spanish people of the Napoleonic Wars
Women in 19th-century warfare
Women in war in Spain